The 2007–08 Wichita State Shockers men's basketball team represented Wichita State University in the 2007–08 NCAA Division I men's basketball season. The team, which played in the Missouri Valley Conference (MVC), was led by first-year head coach Gregg Marshall.

Missouri Valley Conference standings 

Wichita State Shockers men's basketball seasons
Wichita State
Shock
Shock